Attitude may refer to:

Philosophy and psychology
 Attitude (psychology), an individual's predisposed state of mind regarding a value
 Propositional attitude, a relational mental state connecting a person to a proposition

Mathematics and engineering 
 Orientation (geometry), also called attitude, an attribute of objects in space, which together with position determines their placement
 Spacecraft attitude control, control of a spacecraft's attitude
 Flight dynamics (fixed-wing aircraft), the description and control of an aircraft's attitude
 Rotation formalisms in three dimensions, various mathematical descriptions of three-dimensional attitude

Television
 Attitude (TV series), a New Zealand television show
 Attitudes (TV series), an American television talk show on Lifetime Television

Music
 Attitude Records, a record label
 Attitudes (band), a 1970s pop/rock quartet

Albums 
 Attitude (April Wine album) (1993)
 Attitude (Collette album) (1991)
 Attitude (EP), a 2010 EP by Meisa Kuroki
 Attitudes (Lorie album)
 Attitude (Rip Rig + Panic album) (1983)
 Attitudes (Demis Roussos album) (1982)
 Attitude (Susperia album)
 Attitude (Troop album) (1989)
 Attitudes, a 1982 album by Brass Construction

Songs 
 "Attitude" (Alien Ant Farm song) (2002)
 "Attitude" (The Kinks song) (1979)
 "Attitude" (Misfits song) (1978)
 "Attitude" (Sepultura song) (1996)
 "Attitude" (Suede song) (2003)
 "The Attitude", by Annihilator from Ballistic, Sadistic
 "Attitude", by Bad Brains from Black Dots
 "Attitude", by Nick Cannon from the self-titled album
 "Attitude", by Fireflight from The Healing of Harms
 "Attitude", by Information Society from the self-titled album
 "Attitude", by Metallica from ReLoad

Other uses
 Attitude (art), the posture or gesture given to a figure by a painter or sculptor
 Attitude (ballet position), a ballet position in which the dancer stands on one leg with the other leg raised and turned out
 Attitude (heraldry)
 Attitude (obstetrics), an obstetrical term referring to the fetal head flexion at birth
 Attitude (magazine), a British gay lifestyle magazine 
 Attitude: The New Subversive Cartoonists, an anthology of editorial cartoons
 WWF Attitude, a 1999 video game
 The Attitude Era, an era in the WWF
 Dodge Attitude, a series of vehicles sold by Fiat Chrysler Automobiles